Mark Braverman (born 1984) is an Israeli mathematician and theoretical computer scientist.
He was awarded an EMS Prize in 2016 as well as Presburger Award in the same year. In 2019, he was awarded the Alan T. Waterman Award. In 2022 he won the IMU Abacus Medal. 

He earned his doctorate from the University of Toronto in 2008, under the supervision of Stephen Cook.
After this, he did post-doctoral research at Microsoft Research and then joined the faculty at University of Toronto.
In 2011, he joined the Princeton University department of computer science. In 2014 he was an Invited Speaker with talk Interactive information and coding theory at the International Congress of Mathematicians in Seoul.

Braverman is the son of mathematician Elena Braverman and, through her, the grandson of his co-author, mathematical statistician .

References

External links 
 

1984 births
Living people
Israeli mathematicians
University of Toronto alumni
Princeton University faculty
Nevanlinna Prize laureates